Crossing sequence may refer to:

Crossing sequence (railways), a sequence of safety actions carried out when a train approaches and passes a level crossing
Crossing sequence (Turing machines)